Foxtrott is the recording name of Canadian electronic music artist Marie-Hélène Delorme.

Foxtrott's first significant release was her self-released EP Shields in 2012 before signing to One Little Indian Records, which released her full-length debut album A Taller Us in 2015.

A Taller Us was a longlisted nominee for the 2016 Polaris Music Prize.

Foxtrott released her second album "Meditations I-II-III" in 2018. 

Delorme received a Canadian Screen Award nomination for Best Original Song at the 9th Canadian Screen Awards in 2021, for her song "Timid Joyous Atrocious" from the film Sugar Daddy.

Discography
Shields (2012)
A Taller Us (2015)
Meditations (2018)

References

Canadian electronic musicians
Canadian indie pop musicians
One Little Independent Records artists
French Quebecers
Living people
Canadian DJs
Electronic dance music DJs
Year of birth missing (living people)
Best Original Song Genie and Canadian Screen Award winners
21st-century Canadian women musicians